Daniel Smith (born October 7, 1977) is an American journalist and author of the 2012 book Monkey Mind: A Memoir of Anxiety. He has written articles and essays for The New York Times Magazine, The Atlantic, Slate, n+1, Harper's Magazine, New York, and others.

Early years
Smith was born and raised in Plainview, New York. He attended Brandeis University, where he studied English and Russian literature. He wrote a humor column for the school's paper, The Justice, and was a member of its improv comedy troupe. He graduated in 1999.

Career
Smith worked as a staff editor for The Atlantic, and published his first major article there in 2001. The article, "Shock and Disbelief," was about electroshock therapy, and would become the center of a libel suit against Smith and the magazine. It later appeared in the 2002 collection The Best American Science and Nature Writing. Smith helped to edit the 2007 anthology The American Idea: The Best of The Atlantic Monthly.

His first book, 2007's Muses, Madmen and Prophets: Hearing Voices and the Borders of Sanity, explores the history and science of hearing voices. His 2012 memoir Monkey Mind recounts the circumstances that led to his lifelong, occasionally crippling struggles with anxiety and its related symptoms. While primarily experiential, it also touches on the history of anxiety in literature, science and philosophy. Smith was praised for the book's sympathetic, humorous and entertaining tone. Monkey Mind was a New York Times bestseller, and was included on Oprah Winfrey's 2013 list of 40 Books to Read Before Turning 40.

Smith holds the Mary Ellen Donnelly Critchlow Endowed Chair in English at the College of New Rochelle, and he has also taught at Bryn Mawr College. From 2011 to 2012, he co-hosted the first six episodes of n+1 magazine's The n+1 Podcast. He was a guest on The Colbert Report in 2007; on NPR's Talk of the Nation in 2012; and on WTF with Marc Maron in 2012.

Personal life
Smith lives in Brooklyn, New York.

Bibliography

Books

 Associate editor, The American Idea: The Best of The Atlantic Monthly (2007, Doubleday)
 Monkey Mind: A Memoir of Anxiety (2012, Simon & Schuster)

Essays and reporting
 "Shock and Disbelief" - The Atlantic, February 2001 
 "Shock and Disbelief," The Best American Science and Nature Writing (2002, Houghton Mifflin) 
 "The Surgery of Last Resort" - Granta, Issue 85, Spring 2004 
 "The Contrarian in Combat" - The Atlantic, January 2005 
 "Transcranial Magnetic Stimulation" - n+1, February 14, 2005 
 "Political Science" - The New York Times Magazine, September 4, 2005 
 "Can You Live With the Voices in Your Head?" - New York Times Magazine, March 25, 2007 
 "Not Strictly Platonic" - Slate, June 28, 2007 
 "Two Letters on the Democratic Primary" - n+1, February 4, 2008 
 "The Doctor Is in Your PC" - Slate, April 29, 2008 
 "What Is Art For?" - New York Times Magazine, November 14, 2008 
 "Escape to Dubai" - New York, November 16, 2008 
 "The Doctor Is IN" - The American Scholar, Autumn 2009 
 "The Very Grouchy Daddy" - Slate, October 8, 2009 
 "Is There an Ecological Unconscious?" - New York Times Magazine, January 27, 2010 
 "The University Has No Clothes" - New York, May 1, 2011 
 "Andrew Jackson, the New Face of Modern Art" - n+1, July 29, 2011 
 "The Agony and Ecstasy of Mike Daisey" - Slate, October 13, 2011 
 "It's Still the 'Age of Anxiety.' Or Is It?" - The New York Times, January 14, 2012 
 "The Maniac in Me" - New York Times Magazine, April 20, 2012 
 "Do the Jews Own Anxiety?" - The New York Times, May 26, 2012 
 "The Anxious Idiot" - The New York Times, August 11, 2012 
 "Can anxiety kill your ability to love?" - CNN, August 23, 2012 
 "Nothing to Do but Embrace the Dread" - The New York Times, July 13, 2013 
 "It's the End of the World as We Know It… and He Feels Fine" - New York Times Magazine, April 17, 2014 
 "Consume, Screw, Kill: The origins of today's mass extinction" - Harper's Magazine, May 2014

Selected TV appearances and radio broadcasts
 The Colbert Report, Comedy Central, June 14, 2007
 The Brian Lehrer Show, WNYC, November 20, 2008; July 9, 2012
 Talk of the Nation, NPR, July 3, 2012
 The Today Show, NBC, August 21, 2012
 CBS This Morning, CBS, August 28, 2012
 WTF with Marc Maron, November 8, 2012

References 

1977 births
Living people
21st-century American essayists
21st-century American memoirists
Brandeis University alumni
People from Plainview, New York
The New Yorker people
Writers from New York (state)